Allendale is a former settlement in Alameda County, California now annexed to Oakland. A post office opened in 1903 and by 1908 was a branch of the Oakland post office. Allendale was named for Charles E. Allen, a real estate broker.

The commercial district of Allendale is located along 38th Avenue up and down from where it crosses Allendale Avenue. Allendale Elementary School is located there. Allendale is on what might be called the cinema archipelago of East Oakland. Each commercial district (with an exception or two) had a theatre beginning with the 1920s or so. This applied to not only Allendale District, but nearby Laurel (which had two), Fairfax, Dimond, and Fruitvale (which had a second one nearby at Foothill and 35th Avenue), and another at the foot of Park Boulevard on the east side of the lake. The Allendale theatre, like most of the others, has been converted to apartments. The one that has continued in use as a theatre is the Grand Lake, at the edge of East Oakland at the north end of Lake Merritt. There are others in downtown Oakland and North Oakland.

References

Neighborhoods in Oakland, California